John Michael Kudrick (born December 23, 1947) is an Eastern Catholic prelate and, since the acceptance of his resignation by Pope Francis on Saturday, May 7, 2016, the Bishop Emeritus of Parma for the Byzantines.

Early life
The son of George and Amelia Kudrick, John Kudrick was born in Lloydell, Pennsylvania in 1947.

Education 
He graduated as valedictorian of his class from Adams-Summerhill High School. Joining the  Third Order Regular of St. Francis on January 29, 1967, Kudrick studied at Saint Francis College in Loretto, Pennsylvania, graduating with a bachelor of arts in philosophy and in mathematics in 1970. Kudrick continued his studies for the priesthood at St. Francis Seminary, also in Loretto, from which he received a master of divinity degree in 1975. He also received a master of science degree in mathematics in 1973 from Indiana University of Pennsylvania as well as a master of science degree in computer and information science from Ohio State University in 1977.

Work 
Kudrick was ordained a priest on May 3, 1975, staying on at Saint Francis College as a member of the mathematics and computer science faculty. In 1978, he was named director of the university's computer services. He was director of postulants for the Order from 1976 until 1980. Kudrick assisted at parishes of the Byzantine Catholic Archeparchy of Pittsburgh during his time as a Franciscan friar, and eventually petitioned for incardination into the archeparchy, which he received in May 1987. He served at several parishes as a priest under Archbishop Judson Procyk, and his last assignment was as proto-presbyter of the Cathedral of St. John in Munhall from 1998 until 2002.

When Procyk died on April 13, 2001, Kudrick was elected administrator of the vacant Archeparchy of Pittsburgh on April 24, 2001. He served as administrator of the Archeparchy of Pittsburgh until the installation of the new Archeparch, Metropolitan Basil Schott, on July 9, 2002. Kudrick was consecrated a Bishop by him a day later on July 10, 2002.

See also
 

 Catholic Church hierarchy
 Catholic Church in the United States
 Historical list of the Catholic bishops of the United States
 List of Catholic bishops of the United States
 Lists of patriarchs, archbishops, and bishops

References

External links 

 Ruthenian Catholic Eparchy of Parma Official Site

Episcopal succession

1947 births
People from Cambria County, Pennsylvania
Third Order Regular Franciscans
Saint Francis University alumni
Indiana University of Pennsylvania alumni
Ohio State University alumni
Ruthenian Catholic bishops
American Eastern Catholic bishops
Living people
Former members of Catholic religious institutes